The 1935 Hong Kong Sanitary Board election was supposed to be held on 22 May 1935 for the one of the two unofficial seats in the Sanitary Board of Hong Kong. It was the last election for the Sanitary Board before it was renamed to Urban Council in 1936.

Only ratepayers who were included in the Special and Common Jury Lists of the years or ratepayers who are exempted from serving on Juries on account of their professional avocations, unofficial members of the Executive or Legislative Council, or categories of profession were entitled to vote at the election.

Dr. Li Shu-fan held his seat without being contested.

References
 Endacott, G. B. Government and people in Hong Kong, 1841-1962 : a constitutional history Hong Kong University Press. (1964) 
 The Hong Kong Government Gazette

Hong Kong
1935 in Hong Kong
Sanitary
Uncontested elections
May 1935 events
1935 elections in the British Empire